Il Sole 24 Ore Radiocor is an Italian business and financial news agency owned by the newspaper Il Sole 24 Ore with five offices in Rome, Milan, Turin, New York City and Brussels.

External links 
 Official Site 
 Archives 

News agencies based in Italy
Mass media in Rome
Mass media in Milan
Mass media in Turin